Pumpkin dessert may refer to:

Pumpkin pie
Kabak tatlisi, a Turkish cuisine dish made with pumpkin
Filhós, a traditional Christmas dessert in Portugal often made with pumpkin
Zuccotto ("little pumpkin"), an Italian cuisine dessert made using a pumpkin shaped mold